Ghatshila subdivision is an administrative subdivision of the East Singhbhum district in the Kolhan division in the state of Jharkhand, India.

Administration 
The district consists of two subdivisions - (1) Dhalbhum subdivision with Patamda, Boram, Golmuri-cum-Jugsalai and Potka CD blocks, and (2) Ghatshila subdivision with Ghatshila, Dhalbhumgarh, Musabani, Dumaria, Gurbandha, Chakulia and Baharagora CD blocks.

The subdivisions of Purbi Singhbhum  district have the following distinctions:

Note: Calculated on the basis of block-wise data available.

Police stations 
Police stations in the Ghatshila subdivision are at:

 Bharagora 
 Chakulia 
 Dumaria 
 Dhalbhumgarh 
 Galudih 
 Ghatshila 
 Gurbanda 
 Jadugora 
 Musabani 
 Burasol 
 Maubhandar

Blocks 
Community development blocks in the Ghatshila subdivision are:

Education  
In 2011, in Ghatshila subdivision out of a total 1,086 inhabited villages in 7 CD blocks there were 80 villages with pre-primary schools, 768 villages with primary schools, 281 villages with middle schools, 51 villages with secondary schools, 11 villages with senior secondary schools, 4 villages with general degree colleges, 304 villages with no educational facility.

The 4 census towns + 1 nagar panchayat had 54 primary schools, 30 middle schools, 21 secondary schools, 11 senior secondary schools, 6 general degree colleges. (Census towns are normally considered to be a part of the CD block but it is not clear where these are being considered here). 
.*Senior secondary schools are also known as Inter colleges in Jharkhand.

Educational institutions  
The following institutions are located in Ghatshila subdivision:

Ghatshila College was established at Ghatshila in 1961.
Baharagora College was established at Baharagora in 1969.
Shibu Ranjan Khan Memorial Degree College was established at Chakuliya in 2010.
 BDSL Mahila College, Ghatsila was established at Ghatsila in 1982.

(Information about degree colleges with proper reference may be added here)

Healthcare  
In 2011, in Ghatshia subdivision, in the 7 CD blocks, there were 9 villages with primary health centres, 68 villages with primary health subcentres, 23 villages with maternity and child welfare centres, 5 villages with allopathic hospitals, 11 villages with dispensaries, 1 village with a veterinary hospital, 27 villages with family welfare centres, 38 villages with medicine shops.

The 4 census towns + 1 nagar panchayat had 7 hospitals, 7 nursing homes, 84 dispensaries, 171 maternity and child welfare centres, 45 medicine shops. (Census towns are normally considered to be a part of the CD block but it is not clear where these are being considered here).  
.*Private medical practitioners, alternative medicine etc. not included

Medical facilities

(Anybody having referenced information about location of government/ private medical facilities may please add it here)

References  

  

Sub-divisions in Jharkhand